Ho-Kau Chan (1932 – 23 July 2021) was a Hong Kong actress and Cantonese opera singer. She was credited with over 130 films.

Early life 
In 1932, Chan was born in Hong Kong. Chan’s ancestral hometown is Panyu district, Guangzhou, Guangdong province. Her given name at birth has a well-known meaning and therefore special pronunciation among scholars.

Chan's father, Chan Kai-hung, founded the Kwok Sing Theatre where she was a student first under Pak Kit-Cho (born Ha Park-Cheung ;) among a group of tutors while in grade school until the Japanese occupation of Hong Kong in 1941.

After the war, she continued training under Tang Chiu Lan-Fong (Langfong Cantonese Opera School) while in high school and then mostly under  Ju-Hua Fen (aka Fan Guk-Fa) in Chiu Ciu Academy (see John Lone) for over a decade since 1955.

Career 
Chan started her Cantonese opera singing career by working her way to the top from humble beginnings, notwithstanding her father's connections. Her choice was well-received by veterans including Sit Kok-sin and leading actress Cheung. (Note:- There is no information on record available yet as to how Chan met Sit or Cheung in 1951.)

Chan was on her debut tour overseas (Singapore) in September 1951 with Siu-Lei Chun, Chun's sister and their mother. Eventually, spent months and years in Singapore and Vietnam before earning job offers in Hong Kong to join well-known or established troupes. Settling down back in Hong Kong, she was hired as the second female lead to work with Lai-Zhen Yu by Ching Wa-Hang(), the female Guan Yu.

Chan became notable and joined the Hing Sun Sing Opera Troupe (慶新聲劇團) in 1962 as a Hua Dan or lead female Cantonese opera singer. She then joined the Chung San Sing Opera Troupe (頌新聲劇團) in 1965 until the male lead retired. Chan is known for her role as a married woman or woman warrior opposite this particular co-lead generally.

As an agile, experienced matriarch during the United States tour in 1967, Chan managed to pickup where this male lead left off. The mixed crew, of both local backgrounds and from Hong Kong like Chan, continued onto a second term contract to work for months while waiting for Yam Kim Fai and Bak Sheut Sin to arrive in 1968. To tie over, she worked with a very senior retired performer (father of Lowell Lo) in Seattle, then a younger Hong Kong performer who was originally scheduled to be the next male lead but arrived without his co-lead, having herself invited another male lead from Hong Kong to join her.

Chan is otherwise also known for Huashan (lively girl) roles such as Hongniang, Tam Kee-yee and Pan Jinlian on stage opposite generations of various co-leads since 1960. She had similar roles also in 1962 film Battle at Sizhou, for example, as Clam Spirit.

In 1953, Chan crossed over as an actress in Hong Kong films. Chan first appeared in A Battle in An Old City, a 1953 film directed by Chang Mung-Wan. Chan appeared in many Cantonese opera films including as Madam Wong in	The Precious Lotus Lamp (1956-1958, three episodes), Love and Hate (aka The Feud) (1956), The Naughty Princess and Her Lover (aka Between You and Me) (1957), and The Fox-Spirit's Romance (aka The Strange Fox) (1957). Chan's last film was Secret Agent No. 1, a 1970 Crime film directed by Walter Tso. Chan was credited with over 130 films.

In 1961 film Three Battles to Secure Peace for Nation, Chan established her woman warrior status opposite future fellow co-lead on stage for the next thirty plus years. Acrobatic pose stemmed from fighting scene of this film had become classic movementson stage.

Chan was compared by some to Christa Ludwig.

Repertoire 
|*| Chan was the female lead of original cast since 1962 in the following partial list. The show must go on for weeks or months in those years she spent overseas.

According to her co-lead in Ho Siu Lin Opera Troupe, Chan had a habit of not speaking up to playwrights even when she did not like the scripts. Lu Meng-zheng - A Poor Scholar from 1998 returned a few times while the debut was funded by HK Arts Festival.

Some playwrights only found their scripts not returning to stage for over a decade or decades. Other playwrights never realized because they passed away soon after the debut. For example, Ho Siu Lin Opera Troupe debuted two more scripts in 1998, Yu Zhou Feng in July and A Thorn Hairpin in November, without public funding.

Filmography

Films 
This is a partial list of films.
 1953 A Battle in An Old City
 1956 The Precious Lotus Lamp - Madam Wong (wife of the male lead character)
 1956 Love and Hate (aka The Feud) 
 1957 The Naughty Princess and Her Lover (aka Between You and Me)
 1957 The Precious Lotus Lamp (The Sequel) - Madam Wong
 1957 The Fox-Spirit's Romance (aka The Strange Fox) 
 1958 The Precious Lotus Lamp (Part 3, Concluding Episode) - Madam Wong
 1958 A Buddhist Recluse for 14 Years (as Lu Qiao ) 
 1958 The Tragic Story of Liang Shanbo and Zhu Yingtai (aka Butterfly Lovers, as the maid Rén Xīn )
 1959 Hell or Paradise (as Lam Ah Ching, reflecting the debut overseas in 1951.)
 1959 Tragedy of the Emperor's Daughter (aka Di Nü Hua)
 1959 Fan of Fragrant Wood (as maid, the matchmaker)
 1960 Spring Lamps Festival (as Sheung Siu-chong)
 1960 Ten Schoolgirls (vocal & as always "food in the mouth and sleep" girl)
 1961 Three Battles to Secure Peace for Nation
 1961 Leung Hung Yuk's Victory at Wong Tin Tong (as Han Soeng-tak, elder son of Han Shizhong)
 1961 Female General Mrs. Yang
 1961 Secret Book (Part 1, Part 2) (aka The Magic Crane) - Lee Ching Luen 
 1962 Secret Book (Part 3, Concluding Episode)
 1962 Knight of the Victory Marked Flag (aka Banners of Victory)
 1962 Battle at Sizhou (as Clam Spirit opposite Fan Guk-Fa, her master)
 1962 The Royal Wedding in the Palace (as Ying Ying, the head Lady-in-waiting)
 1963 The Battling Sounds
 1963 The Iron Wild Goose (Part 1)
 1963 The Iron Wild Goose (Part 2)
 1963-64 The Golden Hairpin (Part 1-4), aka Jade Hairpin Oath by Wolong Sheng (credited as gam1 tung4)
 1964 The Pitiless Sword
 1965  (Part 1, Part 2 Concluding Episode)
 1965 Sword of Swords, the sequel
 1965 Story of the Sword and the Sabre (Part 3, Part 4)
 1966 Night of the Opera Stars (aka Goddess of Mercy Celebrates Her Birthday at Xiang Shan) – Documentary

Theater Performance

Since 1940

Hong Kong 
 1949, Myrica Branch Troupe
 1949, Wah Tak Leisure Amusement
 1957, Kok Sing Troupe in July 
- Lady White Snake, as second lead actress (Lady Green Snake)
- Spotlight

Abroad 
 1959, Former Singapore Badminton Hall with Ho Fei-Fan
- Nanyang Siang Pau articles indicate that Chan as the female lead of this troupe prepared for the following night performance after finishing that night performance. Chan worked with her supporting female lead until 4am before going to bed. This tour was well received and the supporting actress joined Chan for the 1967 tour.

Since 1960

Hong Kong 
As Hua Dan or lead female actress since 1962 in:-
 Hing Sun Sing Opera Troupe (慶新聲劇團)
 Chung San Sing Opera Troupe (頌新聲劇團)

Abroad 
1967, Kun Lun Troupe 
1) Repertoire/titles
- #1 to #8 listed above (See )
- Beauty Fades From Twelve Ladies' Tower
- Goddess of the Luo River
- Wang Bao Chuan
- The Dream Encounter Between Emperor Wu of Han and Lady Wa
- Liang Zhu Hen
- Return of the Swallows
- A Serenade
- The Smile of a Beauty
- Mò lù xiāo láng
- Qián chéng wàn lǐ (revised)
- Others
2) A crew of mixed backgrounds for this United States tour.
-  while the organizer mentioned a different name as the next male lead, according to press report.
- Actress Cheung, Chan first met in early 1950s.
- Chi Yau Chung (which means Freedom Bell, teacher of Mak Bing-wing)
- Siu-Lei Chun, Chan worked in her 1951-52 crew as career debut overseas.
- not listed in the two 1968 San Francisco postbills now kept in library.
- July 1968 postbills regarding performance at Victory Theatre of Los Angeles had Li Qian as Advisor and Lai-Zhen Yu was listed for guest appearances.
- Others

Since 1970

Hong Kong 
1971-1972,  Opera Troupe and his student So Siu-tong, playwright Poon Cheuk.
- The Three Sieges of Zhu Village, aka Peking Opera sān dǎ zhù jiā zhuāng, as Wu Sam Neung
- Theft of the Red Pongee, as Miss Hung Siu (meaning red pongee).
- Recording in 1936 of  opposite  who played Miss Hung Siu, was from Brunswick Records, with title Kunlun Nu Theft of the Red Pongee. 
- Wong Chin-sui performed a version on stage in 1949 with Law Lai Kuen. The Troupe called Tai Qián Chéng was in Macau. 
- Finale performance in Ko Shing Theatre before its closure on 16 March 1972.

Abroad 
1974, Diamond Troupe North America tour with Lam Kam-tong
- In 1974, Chan with a crew of mostly young up-and-coming Hong Kong performers, 7 days extended to 11 days. The Golden Harvest Theater event at 285 Spadina Avenue was profitable and encouraging to the organizer in Toronto. She was recommended to perform in Toronto by then 1967 owner/operator of Chuan Kung Music Palace Theatre in New York which punished Lam for trying to replace Chan when he felt his thunder stolen in San Francisco, first stop of 1967 tour, Lam's debut tour overseas.
- In 1986, Chan was again invited to build a troupe for May/June North America tour. When she asked to have Lam as co-lead, the organizer declined.

Since 1980 
 1984, Chinese Opera Fortnight

 1993 A Heartbreaking Reunion  (aka Butterfly Lovers)

Since 2000 
 2002 Hong Kong Arts Festival presented a series in her honour, entitled The Virtuosity of Chan Ho-kau

 2003, opposite Lam Kam-tong, only performed eight shows on seven days from 17 September 2003 to 23 September 2003 as listed below while the scheduled May performances (from 16 May 2003 to 22 May 2003) was canceled due to SARS.

 2004 The Villain, The General and the Heroic Beauty on 1 December 2004 in a series named Showcase of masterpieces by master playwrights of the yearly event Bravo! A Cantonese Opera Fiesta!

Since 2010 
 2011-2017 mainly in Sunbeam Theatre, Guanyin and Pan Jinlian (by playwright Li Kui-ming)
 2016 Sacrificing the Son
 2017 Excerpt, Pan Jinlian Seducing Her Brother-in-law
 2018 Judge Yin (of Hell) and Judge Yang (on Earth), aka Judge of Hell and Guillotine Judge, Chan first debuted in 1999, an episode of Peking opera collection Zha Panguan in Cantonese opera. 
 2018 The Return of Lady Wenji

Discography 
 2010, Ai Shui Jiang He, by Fu Zheng Tang.
 1993, Shen Sanbai and Wife Yun (see Shen Fu, Six Records of a Floating Life), by Fung Hang Record Ltd. (FHCD-4025), 1979 first edition.
 1992, Farewell to Zhu Bian upon his departure, a fund raising, Haven of Hope Christian Service (Hong Kong) by playwright Qin Zhongying.
 1980, A Wedding in the Dream, aka Mei Lanfang's Remorse at Death, by Tien Shing Records (TSLP 2156)
 1978, Gao Junbao  si tan ying fang (TSLP 2150)
 1977, Justice Bao versus Chen Shimei and Qin Xianglian, by Tien Shing Records (TSLP 2142)
 1977, Martial Heroes, by Tien Shing Records (TSLP 2130)
 1969, Hongniang Interrogated, by Fung Hang Record Ltd.
 1958, Yellow Fat Dog & The Wolf, by Tang Ti-sheng.

++「公主 我朱弁恨難當面拜辭。」(Zhu Bian responded) is a line unique in this 1992 release for fundraising with Xiaofeng Chen. (This version of Farewell to Zhu Bian is however one of a few released in various formats opposite various singers over the course of about six decades since Xiaofeng Chen included the story in his repertoire. Some versions have titles, lyrics and melodies very similar to this one. There is no published lyrics about 1992 version for unknown reason.)

The second song is one of a few about the same ("Tale of the Pipa" or "The Story of the Lute") story.

Awards 
 2006 Honorary Fellow. The Hong Kong Academy for Performing Arts.
 2008 MH for her achievements in Cantonese Opera.

Eulogy 
A short eulogy referred to Madam Wong, a character Chan portrayed in 2016, six decades since making those three films very early in her career. In Sacrificing the Son, a Cantonese Opera performance, Chinese Opera Festival 2016, Chan as Madam Wong demonstrated the traditional value instituted into a maiden in a rich and influential family even while seeing, beaten to death, the son she gave birth to and keeping safe the other son of her husband. The journalist found these same quality in Chan.

References

External links 
 Page 68 & 69, Issues 14-25 of 1975, Panorama Magazine, Published by Da Cheng Chu Ban She, Hong Kong, copy owner the University of California, Digitized	28-6-2007 
Iconic Heroines in Cantonese Opera Films
 
 
 Chan Hiu Kau at hkcinemagic.com
 Chen Haoqiu at dianying.com
 Haoqiu Chen at letterboxd.com
 Chan Ho-Kau at senscritique.com

1932 births
2021 deaths
Hong Kong Buddhists
Hong Kong Cantonese opera actresses
Hong Kong film actresses